Ronald Ryan (born July 11, 1938) is a Canadian former professional ice hockey coach and executive.

Biography
Ryan played junior hockey with the Guelph Biltmores and then enrolled in Colby College. He had 245 points in 73 games with his college hockey team. Ryan earned a graduate degree at the University of Pennsylvania before taking a job as an assistant athletic director at Merrimack College in 1964.

In 1965, Ryan was hired as head coach of the Colgate University hockey team. He took a job with the New England Whalers in 1972, serving as assistant general manager during their initial season of World Hockey Association play. After the Whalers won the Avco Cup during its first year of existence, coach Jack Kelley, who also served as general manager, moved into solely a front office position, and Ryan was hired as head coach. Ryan coached the Whalers to a division title in 1973–74, but his team was upset in the first round by the Chicago Cougars. He was relieved of his coaching duties and replaced by Kelley with five games left in the 1974–75 season, despite having his team sitting in first place once again. Ryan then briefly served as a scout, but he was elevated to the position of general manager in December 1975, holding this role for two seasons. Ryan then worked in several other front office roles for the Whalers and later served as president of SportsChannel, a cable sports network.

Ryan joined the Philadelphia Flyers in 1988 as an executive vice president, and was named the chief operating officer of the team in 1991. He was named the team's president in 2003 and held that position for three years until his retirement.

Personal life
He is married to Brenda, a French teacher, and the father of actress Blanchard Ryan, who is also an avid ice hockey fan. She was also married to hockey player Neil Little, whom she divorced, without children.

Awards and honors

Head coaching record

College

WHA

References
2010–11 Philadelphia Flyers Media Guide. Philadelphia Flyers. p. 32

External links

Ron Ryan's coaching record at Hockey-Reference.com

1938 births
Living people
Canadian ice hockey coaches
Colby College alumni
Penn Quakers men's ice hockey coaches
Merrimack Warriors men's ice hockey coaches
Colgate Raiders men's ice hockey coaches
Hartford Whalers executives
Hartford Whalers scouts
Ice hockey people from Ontario
National Hockey League executives
New England Whalers coaches
Philadelphia Flyers executives
Sportspeople from Welland
AHCA Division I men's ice hockey All-Americans